Vilémov may refer to places in the Czech Republic:

Vilémov (Chomutov District), a municipality and village in the Ústí nad Labem Region
Vilémov (Děčín District), a municipality and village in the Ústí nad Labem Region
Vilémov u Šluknova railway station
SK Stap Tratec Vilémov, an association football club
Vilémov (Havlíčkův Brod District), a market town in the Vysočina Region
Vilémov (Olomouc District), a municipality and village in the Olomouc Region